The 2018 All-Ireland Senior Ladies' Football Championship was the 45th edition of the Ladies' Gaelic Football Association's premier inter-county Ladies' Gaelic Football tournament. It was known for sponsorship reasons as the TG4 All-Ireland Senior Ladies' Football Championship.

It was won by Dublin.

Competition format

Provincial championships

Connacht, Leinster, Munster and Ulster each organise their provincial championship. All matches are knockout.

All-Ireland

 Group stage
In 2018, a new round-robin format was introduced in the All-Ireland championship. The 12 teams are drawn into four groups of three teams.

Knockout stage
The winners of each group and the runners-up compete in the four All-Ireland quarter-finals. Two semi-finals and a final follow.

Provincial championships

Connacht Championship

Connacht Final

Leinster Championship

Leinster Final

Munster Championship

Munster Semi-Finals

Munster Final

Ulster Championship

Ulster Semi-Finals

Ulster Final

All-Ireland Group Stage

All-Ireland Group Stage

In 2018, a new round-robin format was introduced in the All-Ireland championship. The 12 teams are drawn into four groups of three teams, with each group containing one provincial champion, one provincial beaten finalist, and one beaten provincial semi-finalist (two each from Munster and Ulster). Each team plays the other teams in its group once.

There are three rounds in each group with the provincial champions playing in rounds two and three. Three group points are awarded for a win and one for a draw. The winners and runners-up in each group compete in the four All-Ireland quarter-finals.

Group 1

Group 2

Group 3

Group 4

All-Ireland Knockout

All-Ireland Quarter-Finals

Each of the four winners from the group stage play one of the four runners-up.

All-Ireland Semi-Finals

All-Ireland final

Relegation play-offs

Relegation Format

The provincial championship winners are exempt from relegation even if they finish bottom of their group. The number of relegation play-off games is therefore dependent on the number of non provincial winners who finish bottom of their group. The losers of the relegation play-offs play in next year's intermediate championship.

Relegation qualifiers

Relegation play-off Match

Tipperary are relegated to the All-Ireland Intermediate Ladies' Football Championship for 2019.

Records

Scoring Events
Widest winning margin: 33 points
 Cork 8-18 – 1-6 Westmeath (All-Ireland Quarter-Final)
Most goals in a match: 13		
Donegal 9-21 – 4-8 Armagh (Ulster final)
Most points in a match: 36    	
Mayo 3-23 – 4-13 Cavan (group stage)
Most goals by one team in a match: 9
Donegal 9-21 – 4-8 Armagh (Ulster final)
Most goals by a losing team: 4
Donegal 9-21 – 4-8 Armagh (Ulster final)
Mayo 3-23 – 4-13 Cavan (group stage)
 Highest aggregate score: 68 points
Donegal 9-21 – 4-8 Armagh (Ulster final)
Lowest aggregate score: 28 points
Cork 2-11 – 0-11 Donegal (All-Ireland Semi-Final)

See also

2018 All-Ireland Intermediate Ladies' Football Championship

References